Nathaniel Buckmaster (May 1, 1787 - June 1855) was a builder, military officer, sheriff, prison operator, and state legislator in Illinois. Samuel A. Buckmaster who followed in his footsteps was his nephew. Buckmaster was a Democrat.

He served in the Illinois House of Representatives from 1820 to 1822 and from 1834 to 1836. He was elected Madison County, Illinois’ sheriff in 1821 and served several consecutive terms.

He was a commanding officer in the Black Hawk War. He married Harriet Bartling in 1832 and they had four children.

References

Democratic Party members of the Illinois House of Representatives
1787 births
1855 deaths
American people of the Black Hawk War
People from Madison County, Illinois
19th-century American politicians
Illinois sheriffs